Siege of Bayeux may refer to:

Siege of Bayeux (1106), the siege and capture of the town by King Henry I of England
Siege of Bayeux (1415), the siege and capture of the town by the English during the Hundred Years' War
Siege of Bayeux (1450), the siege and capture of the town by the French during the Hundred Years' War